Uba Budo is a village on São Tomé Island in the nation of São Tomé and Príncipe. Its population is 468 (2012 census). The locality Montes Hermínios lies 2 km south of Uba Budo.

Population history

References

Populated places in Cantagalo District